The Oregon Open is a darts tournament that has been held in Lincoln City since 1972.

The first editions solely featured women's events ; the tournament later held both men's and women's events in 1985, 1986 and from 2008 onwards.

Results

References 
 https://dartswdf.com/tournaments/oregon-open
 52nd annual Oregon Open Flyer

Darts tournaments
Sports competitions in Oregon